Little CMS or LCMS is an open-source color management system, released as a software library for use in other programs which will allow the use of International Color Consortium profiles. It is licensed under the terms of the MIT License.

LCMS was one of the first open sourced color management systems. It was initiated by Marti Maria in 1998. As part of the development efforts and as a proof of concept, Marti also made LPROF, a Qt-based profiler suite demonstrating the capabilities of LCMS.

LCMS was hosted on SourceForge.net in 2001, and has had a stable set of releases since then. It is commonly part of many Linux distributions.

LPROF was orphaned and unsupported from early 2004 until August 2005, when LPROF moved from Marti's site to SourceForge.net and active maintenance was taken over by Gerard Klaver, Craig Ringer and Hal Engel. It is now back in development again (with Marti's consent), and is reportedly producing profiles of high quality. LPROF has also started to use parts of the functionality of Argyll CMS, another open source CMS by Graeme Gill.

Usage
LCMS has been used in:
 ABCpdf
 ACDSee since ACDSee Pro 6.0
 Darktable
 Digikam
 Foxit Reader
 GIMP
 GraphicsMagick
 ICC Examin
 ImageMagick
 Inkscape
 Krita
 Media Player Classic
 Microsoft Office for Mac 2011
 Mozilla Firefox up to version 3
 OpenJDK
 Opera
 RawTherapee
 Scribus
 UFRaw
 VueScan
 Google Picasa
 mpv
 Many commercial products

See also

 Color space
 Linux color management

References

External links
 
 

Graphics libraries
Free graphics software
Software using the MIT license